Nasko Zhelev (born 9 January 1960) is a retired Bulgarian football defender.

References

1960 births
Living people
Bulgarian footballers
FC Lokomotiv 1929 Sofia players
1. FC Saarbrücken players
FC 08 Homburg players
2. Bundesliga players
Bulgarian expatriate footballers
Expatriate footballers in Germany
Bulgarian expatriate sportspeople in Germany
Association football defenders
Bulgaria under-21 international footballers
Bulgaria international footballers